The Game is the fourth studio album by American rapper Richie Rich, released September 12, 2000, on Ten-Six Records.  It peaked at number 53 on the Billboard Top R&B/Hip-Hop Albums and at number 10 on the Billboard Independent Albums. Two singles were released, "I Ain't Gonna Do" and  "If...". No music videos were released to promote the album.

Conception
Richie Rich left Def Jam and released this album on his own independent label, Ten-Six Records (created with Lev Berlak), yet most of the material was recorded while he was still on Def Jam.

Track listing
 "Straight Mail" (featuring B-Legit) 4:11
 "I Ain't Gonna Do" 5:04
 "Playboy" 3:48
 "Use Ta Sell" 4:08
 "If..." 5:12
 "The Truth" (featuring Gonzoe & Val Young) 5:05
 "Birds" 3:43
 "Game Don't Stop" (featuring Rhythm & Green) 5:52
 "Bringin' It Back" 3:31
 "Who's House" 3:57
 "How Many Licks" (featuring Yukmouth) 4:53
 "Her Pussy" 4:01
 "Hit Me On The Hip" (featuring Val Young & Rame Royal of Rhythm & Green) 4:26
 "The Game" 3:22
 "Nothin' To Lose" (featuring Ruffa) 3:49
 "Tyme 'N My Life" 4:01

Chart history

References

External links
 The Game at Discogs
 The Game at MusicBrainz

Richie Rich (rapper) albums
2000 albums
Albums produced by Jazze Pha
Albums produced by Mike Dean (record producer)
Albums produced by Bosko
Self-released albums